Flak 'n' Flight is the second live album by American rock band Masters of Reality, released in 2003.

Reception
In 2005, Flak 'n' Flight was ranked number 449 in Rock Hard magazine's book of The 500 Greatest Rock & Metal Albums of All Time.

Track listing 
All songs by Chris Goss, except where noted.
"Opening" (excerpt from "The Ballad of Jody Frosty") - 1:19
"Deep in the Hole" (Goss, Leamy) - 4:24
"Third Man on the Moon" (Goss, Leamy) - 6:16
"Why the Fly?" - 10:56
"Time to Burn" (Goss, Leamy, Catching) - 3:28
"The Blue Garden" (Goss, Harrington) - 7:28
"Rabbit One" - 9:10
"Also Ran Song" (Goss, Leamy) - 3:22
"John Brown" (Goss, Harrington) - 7:44
"100 Years (Of Tears on the Wind)" - 6:54
"High Noon Amsterdam" (Goss, Leamy) - 3:45
"She Got Me (When She Got Her Dress On)" - 4:40
"Cretin Hop" (Ramones cover) - 2:45

Credits 
Chris Goss - vocals, guitar, synthesizers
John Leamy - drums, vocals
Josh Homme - guitar, vocals
Nick Oliveri - bass, vocals

Additional personnel 
Mark Lanegan - vocals on "High Noon Amsterdam"

References

Masters of Reality albums
2003 live albums